Paul Louis Wulff (born February 25, 1967) is an American football coach and former player. In December 2022, he was appointed head coach at California Polytechnic State University. Wulff previously served as the head coach at Eastern Washington University from 2000 to 2007 and at Washington State University from 2008 to 2011, compiling an overall record of 62–80. As a student-athlete, he played on the offensive line at Washington State during the late 1980s, earning honorable mention All-American honors following his senior season in 1989.

Early life and playing career
Born in Woodland, California, Wulff graduated from Davis Senior High School in Davis in 1985. Following his senior year, Wulff was selected to the Optimist All-Star Football Game held in Hughes Stadium. He accepted a scholarship from head coach Jim Walden to attend Washington State University in Pullman, and redshirted his first year in 1985. Wulff started four games at guard for the Cougars as a redshirt freshman in 1986. Later a center, he was a starter on the offensive line from 1986 to 1989 under three different head coaches: Walden, Dennis Erickson, and Mike Price.

During his junior year in 1988, the Cougars were led by Erickson and quarterback Timm Rosenbach, and scored an upset over top-ranked UCLA on the road, the first of five consecutive wins to close out the season. WSU tied for third in the Pac-10, and won the Apple Cup and the Aloha Bowl. It was Washington State's first bowl game in seven years and their first post-season victory in 63 years, since the Rose Bowl in January 1916. WSU finished at 9–3 and sixteenth in both major polls.

In his senior year under Price, the Cougars won six of their first seven games and were ranked fifteenth in mid-October.  After two close losses, Wulff had an emergency appendectomy on Halloween and missed the final two games, both defeats, and WSU finished at 6–5 with no bowl. Still, Wulff was selected for All-Pac-10 Second Team status and Sporting News All-America honorable mention in 1989.

Following graduation in 1990, Wulff signed as an undrafted free agent with the New York Jets of the National Football League (NFL), but was released during the 1990 preseason. During the spring of 1991, he played for the Raleigh–Durham Skyhawks in the newly created World League of American Football (WLAF). The team went winless (0–10) in its inaugural season and was folded. Wulff continued to play for another season in the league with the New York/New Jersey Knights, before ending his active career.

Coaching career
Wulff began his coaching career in 1993 as a volunteer assistant under head coach Dick Zornes at Eastern Washington University in Cheney. Zornes retired after that season and assistant coach Mike Kramer was promoted to head coach, who hired Wulff to a full-time position. After four seasons as the Eagles' offensive line and strength coach, Wulff added offensive coordinator duties in 1998. When Kramer departed for conference rival Montana State after the 1999 season, the school named Wulff his successor.  During his eight seasons as EWU's head coach, Wulff compiled an overall record of 53 wins and 40 losses; the Eagles won two Big Sky Conference co-championships (2004 and 2005) and appeared three times in the Division I-AA (FCS) playoffs. Wulff earned Big Sky Coach of the Year honors in 2001, 2004, and 2005.

Wulff returned to his alma mater after the 2007 season when he was named the 31st head football coach at Washington State on December 10. He was the second alumnus to head the Cougar football program, after Phil Sarboe in the late 1940s. After compiling a 9–40 record during four losing seasons at WSU, Wulff was fired on November 29, 2011, and left with  the lowest winning percentage in school history. His teams only won four games in Pacific-10 Conference play, including a winless 0–9 conference mark in 2009—part of an overall record of 1–11, the worst in the school's modern football history. 

In May 2012, Wulff joined former Pac-10 foe Jim Harbaugh as an offensive assistant with the San Francisco 49ers, with multiple duties on that side of the ball. In January 2014, he was hired as the offensive coordinator and offensive line coach at the University of South Florida in Tampa.

Following almost three years as an offensive line assistant for the Mustangs, Wulff was named head coach at Cal Poly in December 2022.

Personal life
As a youth, Wulff's mother went missing. Although her body was discovered in 1979, 48 days after her disappearance, it was not correctly identified until 2020. The youngest of four children, he went to live with relatives, first with an uncle, then with his oldest brother. 

Wulff met his first wife Tammy Allen at WSU and they married in 1993. Diagnosed with inoperable brain cancer in early 1997, she battled for over five years, but succumbed in March 2002. Wulff and his second wife Sherry have three children.

Head coaching record

References

External links
 Sacramento State profile
 Washington State profile

1967 births
Living people
American football centers
Eastern Washington Eagles football coaches
New York/New Jersey Knights players
Raleigh–Durham Skyhawks players
Sacramento State Hornets football coaches
San Francisco 49ers coaches
South Florida Bulls football coaches
Sportspeople from Greater Sacramento
Washington State Cougars football coaches
Washington State Cougars football players
Davis Senior High School (California) alumni
People from Woodland, California
Coaches of American football from California
Players of American football from California